Battle of Brännkyrka took place on 27 July 1518 in Sweden, during a Swedish uprising against the Danish dominance in Kalmar Union, between Danish forces and Swedish rebel troops. The battle resulted in decisive Swedish victory.

Background
On the Summer of 1518 the Danish king Christian II started a siege of Stockholm in an attempt to quell the rebellion of the party of Sten Sture the Younger, regent of Sweden. With an army, mostly composed of Danish troops and reinforced by German mercenaries, he firstly camped on Norrmalm, but later moved to Södermalm. In July, Sten Sture the Younger advanced from the south along with an army to break the siege. Christian's troops then took the siege off and marched southwards to meet the approaching Swedish forces.

The location of the battle

The main sources of the Battle of Brännkyrka is an account in Latin of a Danish eyewitness, Lars Werman (Lawrence Wermannus), and one in German by a man in Sten Sture service. None of them mentions Brännkyrka.

Werman doesn't specify the exact location of the battle but mentions the place had mountains and hills overgrown with bushes on the left side and on the right side there were swamps and fences. The German narrative reports ene schermüslinth by Aerstede op eyne enge, "a skirmish at Aerstede in a meadow".

The Great Swedish historical chronicle states instead that the battle was fought near  where it was said were found the traces of what was then assumed to be remnants of the Swedes' camp.

Taking into account the circumstances preceding the battle, that Sten Sture's troops marched towards Stockholm from the South and Christian's ones from his camp on Södermalm to meet them, makes a location along the Göta highway a likely place for the skirmish. This is consistent with the above sites, also located around the same site: , Örby mill and southern slopes towards Årstafältet. Valla field which are also listed as a possible site is a direct continuation of the northern slope towards Årstafältet.

A number of other places have also been suggested. One theory is that the battle was fought at Victory Memorial (Sigridsmynde), between Brännkyrka and Huddinge churches.

The battle
No reference to the battle were made by the contemporaries but it was mentioned in Swedish and Danish sources several years later.

According to Swedish sources
Consequently, the Danish army attacked the southern flank but the Swedes repelled the attack and eventually broke through their defense line. This coincided with the appearance of Swedish reinforcement as a part of the foot soldiers that were not yet involved into the battle and who intervened in the attack. In result the Danish front was dissolved and fled. During the escape Danish heavy cavalry was caught in the swamps. Sture took 300 prisoners with him in Stockholm. It is reported that 1600 farmers have remained on the battlefield.

It was believed that Gustav Vasa hold the Swedish banner during the battle but this is now contested. On the other hand, he possibly participated in the battle, at least he was shortly afterwards among Sten Sture's troops.

According to Danish sources
The Danish historian Professor Allen writes: "The first Swedish attack was repulsed and at the second they were thrown away and was chased into the woods. During the persecution the Danish troops were disordered and divided into small clusters. Swedes took advantage of the situation. Under the coverage of the woods they gathered again and broke unexpectedly into a single attack. Danes could not withstand due to the disordered state, whereby they were. Especially the German soldiers were driven out in a quagmire or marsh, and found their death over there. The Danes retreated to Södermalm."

Aftermath
After the battle the Danes withdrew to their camp on Södermalm. After that negotiations were started and an agreement was reached on September 12, 1518 to set up a treaty for a new meeting in July 1519. After that Christian sailed away with the hostages he had before the negotiations.

References in arts and literature
The 's chronicle, written upon Gustav Vasa's request, gives the battle a major role in Gustav Vasa's life. And while the fact that he hold the Swedish banner during the battle is now considered as less likely, the battle is still represented as the first significant achievement of his.

There are multiple references to the battle in literature where it is represented as a major event in Gustav Vasa's life. As well as in poetry and folk songs. One of the earliest references in 1800s it is mentioned in Geijer and Afzelius, Swedish Folk Songs in 1880, that begins with Swerighis menn achtar iagh att loffwa.

References

Brännkyrka
Brannkyrka
History of Stockholm
1518 in Sweden
16th century in Stockholm
Brännkyrka